Fabrício Isidoro Fonseca de Jesus (born 28 January 1992) is a Brazilian football player who plays as a midfielder for S.C. Farense.

Club career
He made his professional debut in the Campeonato Mineiro for Tupi on 1 February 2014 in a game against Minas Boca.

References

1992 births
Footballers from Belo Horizonte
Living people
Brazilian footballers
Primeira Liga players
Democrata Futebol Clube players
Sertãozinho Futebol Clube players
Villa Nova Atlético Clube players
Tupi Football Club players
Louletano D.C. players
S.C. Farense players
Brazilian expatriate footballers
Brazilian expatriate sportspeople in Portugal
Expatriate footballers in Portugal
Association football midfielders